Phacellus dejeani is a species of beetle in the family Cerambycidae. It was described by Buquet in 1838. It is known from Brazil.

References

Phacellini
Beetles described in 1838